The Valdres Line was a Norwegian railway that connected to the Gjøvik Line at Eina with Fagernes in the district of Valdres.  The first stretch opened on 23 November 1902, and the entire route was operational on October 10, 1906.  The line was shut down for regular traffic as of 1 January 1989.

The entire length of the line was 108 kilometers.  It connected the rural areas of Land and Valdres by rail to the main railroad network in Norway, including Oslo and international points beyond. Though there is no regular traffic on the line the 48 km stretch from Eina to Dokka is still permitted for trains and considered part of the national rail network.

History
The line was built by a private company, AS Valdresbanen, in four phases:
 Eina to Dokka (approximately 47 km): regular traffic 28 November 1902
 Dokka to Tonsåsen (31 km): 1 November 1903
 Tonsåsen to Aurdal (18 km): 29 September 1906
 Aurdal to Fagernes (13 km): 29 September 1906

In 1937, the Norwegian government through the Norwegian State Railways took over operations of the line, and in 1953 the line and equipment was modernized to the point that the trip from Oslo to Fagernes took 4.5 hours. In 1955 and 1956 tunnels were built at Høgberget and Tonsåsen, respectively. When Norwegian authorities decided to electrify half of the line distance of Norway in the 1950s and 60s, the Valdres Line was not chosen to be electrified, even though the Gjøvik Line was.

In 1985, a bus service was established between Oslo and Fagernes, reducing the number of annual passengers on the train line by 19,000.  In 1988, the Norwegian legislature decided to shut down regular traffic on the Valdres Line while keeping the tracks between Eina and Leira open for purposes of national security. In 1989, a grassroots movement was started to keep the line, but to no avail. In 1991, the tracks between Leira and Fagernes were lifted (removed).  A private company is formed to arrange chartered trips on the remaining railway.

External links
 Valdres Line advocacy organization

 
Railway lines in Norway
Heritage railways in Norway
Railway lines in Oppland
Railway lines opened in 1902
1902 establishments in Norway
Private railway lines in Norway